The 2006–07 Sporting de Gijón season was the 9th consecutive season of the club in Segunda División after its last relegation from La Liga.

Overview
Real Sporting finished the season in the thirteenth position, the worst position of the club ever since the 1961–62 season.

Squad

From the youth squad

Competitions

Segunda División

Results by round

League table

Matches

Copa del Rey

Matches

Squad statistics

Appearances and goals

|}

References

External links
Profile at BDFutbol
Official website

Sporting de Gijón seasons
Sporting de Gijón